Nikolay Antonovich Dollezhal (– 20 November 2000) was a Russian engineer of Czech origin whose career was spent in the former Soviet program of nuclear weapons and later played an influential role in developing the commercial nuclear power industry of Russia.

Biography

Dollezhal was born in Omelnik in Ekaterinoslav Governorate of the Zaporizhzhia Oblast in Ukraine on 27 October 1899. According to the GlobalSecurity.org investigations, Dollezhal was of Czech origin—his grandfather, Ferdinand Dollezhal, a Czech, was also an engineer who married a Russian woman in the middle 19th century. In 1917, he attended the Bauman Moscow State Technical University (MVTU) where he studied heat engines, thermodynamics, hydrodynamics, electronics, heat exchanger and refrigeration under Nikolay Zhukovsky. In 1923-24, Dollezhal earned his engineer's degree and worked with Moscow's authorities to rehabilitate the civil engineering and transportation infrastructure.

While teaching at MVTU, he joined PJSC Heat and Power (which later was subsumed in Narkomtiazhprom) and worked with Soviet establishment to design new heat engines and turbines under the GOELRO program. In 1929–30, Dollezhal visited various factories in Germany and Austria under the sponsorship of Supreme Economic Council. Upon returning, he soon fell under the espionage investigations by Soviet establishment and was imprisoned until being acquitted in 1932. From 1932–43, Dollezhal worked with Soviet bureaucracy, serving their chief design engineer, and oversaw many of the nitrogen production factories in Russia and Ukraine, and filled positions by hiring graduates of the Leningrad Polytechnic Institute.

Until 1946, Dollezhal was completely unaware of Soviet program of nuclear weapons and it was Nikita Khrushchev who had assigned Dollezhal to Laboratory No. 2 to build a plutonium production reactor. Dollezhal supported the Soviet program and designed the first reactors (based on American designs), graphite moderated types A and AI, that produced plutonium used in Joe 1 nuclear test of 1949 and subsequent nuclear weapons deployment. After 1950, Dollezhal founded the NIKIET on nuclear marine propulsion. His first proposal, Type AM, was not practical for marine uses but became the core of the first nuclear power plant in Obninsk, commissioned in 1954. In the same year, he produced a viable draft of a light water submarine reactor.

Dollezhal pioneered the concept of the pressurized water reactor, which led to numerous military and VVER-type civilian designs. In 1957 Dollezhal Institute launched their first dual-use (civilian energy and weapons-grade plutonium) powerplant, Type EI, and seven years later, the first truly industrial Beloyarsk Nuclear Power Station. All subsequent Soviet reactors (VVER, RBMK) also originated from his firm.

Honours and awards 
 Lenin Prize (1957)
 Three Stalin Prizes (1949, 1952 and 1953)
 Two USSR State Prizes (1970 and 1976)
 Hero of Socialist Labour, twice (1949 and 1984)
 Six Orders of Lenin (incl 1949 and 1984)
 Order of the October Revolution
 Order of the Red Banner of Labour
 Order of the Red Star
 Order of Merit for the Fatherland, 2nd class (1999)
 Kurchatov Gold Medal (Russian Academy of Sciences, 2000)
 Asteroid 10261 Nikdollezhalʹ, discovered by Lyudmila Zhuravleva in 1974, was named in his memory. The official  was published by the Minor Planet Center on 18 March 2003.

References

Further reading
 

1899 births
2000 deaths
Russian people of Czech descent
Soviet people of Czech descent
Bauman Moscow State Technical University alumni
Soviet engineers
Prisoners and detainees of the Soviet Union
Soviet physicists
Nuclear weapons program of the Soviet Union
Soviet nuclear physicists
Full Members of the USSR Academy of Sciences
Full Members of the Russian Academy of Sciences
Heroes of Socialist Labour
Recipients of the Order "For Merit to the Fatherland", 2nd class
Lenin Prize winners
Stalin Prize winners
Recipients of the USSR State Prize
Recipients of the Order of Lenin
Russian engineers
Russian centenarians
Men centenarians